Touch and Go (U.S. The Light Touch) is a 1955 British comedy film directed by Michael Truman, and starring Jack Hawkins, Margaret Johnston, and June Thorburn. The film was made by Ealing Studios. The film was indifferently received on release, and is not generally included in the canon of classic Ealing Comedies. It did, however, pick up two nominations at the 1956 British Academy Film Awards: Margaret Johnston for "Best British Actress", and William Rose for "Best British Screenplay" – Rose did win that year's screenplay award, but for another Ealing film, The Ladykillers.

Plot 
Following an argument with a work superior, furniture designer Jim Fletcher quits his job in a fit of pique. He decides that England has nothing to offer him, and that the future for his family is in Australia. He eagerly sets about making emigration plans, and despite the fact that his wife and family are less than enthusiastic about moving to the other side of the world, he disregards their reservations, and presses ahead. Practical and bureaucratic hitches continually threaten to derail the project. Jim must also deal with the opposition of his in-laws, finds himself missing his job, and starts to have doubts himself about the wisdom of the move. However, the snags and pitfalls are finally sorted out, and a firm departure date is set. Then two days before they are due to leave, the Fletchers' daughter meets, and instantly falls in love with, her ideal man after he rescues the family cat, Heathcliff. A good deal of heart-searching ensues before the Fletchers decide whether or not to go ahead with emigration during a delay caused by a missing Heathcliff.

Cast

Critical reputation 
The Radio Times called the film "A depressing wallow in the sort of whimsy that Ealing foisted upon the world as British Realism"; whereas Leonard Maltin was more positive, calling the film a "wry study".

Box Office
According to Kinematograph Weekly it was a "money maker" at the British box office in 1955.

References

External links 
 
 

1955 films
1955 comedy films
British comedy films
Ealing Studios films
Films set in London
Films directed by Michael Truman
Films produced by Michael Balcon
1950s English-language films
1950s British films